Apprehensive Films was an independent American film production and distribution company in operation from 1997–2016. Its main focus was low-budget Grindhouse-inspired films shot in Super 8 mm film and 16 mm film. In 2006, Apprehensive Films became a DVD distributor specializing in cult, horror and exploitation film. In 2009, Apprehensive Films took over the television distribution of the horror hosted television series Cinema Insomnia which led to their re-licensing the show to AMGTV.

Distributed films

Cinema Insomnia Slime Line DVDs

In 2010, Apprehensive Films introduced a new line of Cinema Insomnia DVDs called Slime Line. The Slime Line DVDs feature brand new audio mixes, new retro film-clips, coming attractions for classic B-movie and new indies. The Slime Line DVDs also contain Slime Points which can be collected and mailed into Apprehensive Films for select prizes. Apprehensive Films has also licensed episodes Dick Tracy Meets Gruesome, Gappa: Monsters From a Prehistoric Planet, In Search of Ancient Astronauts, Super Wheels, and Voyage to the Prehistoric Planet to Amazon Video on Demand.

Slime Line DVDs
Bigfoot: Mysterious Monster
Carnival of Souls
Cinema Insomnia Halloween Special
Creature
Dick Tracy Meets Gruesome
Eegah
First Spaceship on Venus
Gamera: Super Monster
Gappa: Monsters From a Prehistoric Planet
In Search of Ancient Astronauts
Night of the Living Dead
Santa Claus Conquers the Martians
Super Wheels
Voyage to the Prehistoric Planet
The Wasp Woman

References

External links
Official website (archived)
Official Store (archived)
Ernie Fosselius releases (archived)
Why Lie? I Need a Drink documentary (archived)

Mass media companies established in 1997
Film distributors of the United States
Film production companies of the United States
Non-theatrical film production companies
Cinema Insomnia